The 2014 Malaysian sedition dragnet is an ongoing campaign by the government of Malaysia where several citizens were arrested and charged for allegedly making seditious statements in contravention of Section 4 of the Sedition Act 1948. The term "sedition dragnet" is widely used by the Malaysian media to describe the campaign.

Background

The Sedition Act is considered by opposition politicians and activists to be an outdated draconian law introduced by the British colonial government which aims to stifle freedom of expression. Government officials however consider the Sedition Act as necessary to maintain peace in the country.

Another controversial piece of legislation, the Internal Security Act (ISA), was repealed in 2012 by the Najib Razak administration and replaced with the Security Offences (Special Measures) Act 2012 following mounting criticism of the ISA, another colonial era law which had allowed for preventive detention and extrajudicial detention.

Activists and politicians have complained that the dragnet was carried out despite prime minister Najib's earlier promises to repeal the Sedition Act.

Arrests

Among the people arrested were opposition politicians Khalid Abdul Samad, N. Surendran and Teresa Kok while among non-politicians who were arrested were Universiti Malaya law professor, Azmi Sharom and Malaysiakini journalist Susan Loone as well as other political activists. Muhammad Safwan Anang who was convicted under the Sedition Act on 5 September 2014 was charged earlier in 2013 together with PKR's Tian Chua, PAS' Tamrin Ghafar Baba, student activist Adam Adli and social activists Harris Ibrahim and Hishamuddin Rais in relation to their role in allegedly inciting the people to change government through illegal means and is arguably not part of this sedition dragnet. All persons listed below were arrested or charged under the Sedition Act unless specified otherwise.

Related charges

Former Perak chief minister Mohammad Nizar Jamaluddin was charged for criminal defamation under Section 500 of the Penal Code in August 2014 for a statement made in a speech in 2012 about prime minister Najib Razak. Meanwhile, PKR Vice President Rafizi Ramli was charged for provocation of breach of peace under Section 504 of the Penal Code.

References

2014 in Malaysia
History of Malaysia
Human rights abuses in Malaysia